Adweek is a weekly American advertising trade publication that was first published in 1979. Adweek covers creativity, client–agency relationships, global advertising, accounts in review, and new campaigns. During this time, it has covered various shifts in technology, including cable television, the shift away from commission-based agency fees, and the Internet.

As the second-largest advertising-trade publication, its main competitor is Advertising Age. Adweek also operates various blogs focusing on the advertising and mass media industry, including its flagship AdFreak blog and the Adweek Blog Network, which was formed from the assets of Mediabistro.

Related publications include Adweek Magazine's Technology Marketing (ISSN 1536-2272), and Adweek's Marketing Week (ISSN 0892-8274).

In January 2018, Adweek CEO Jeffrey Litvack announced Brandweek, the event, as a first-of-its-kind brand summit to be held September 23–25, 2018 in Palm Springs, Calif., at the Omni Rancho Las Palmas Resort & Spa. Brandweek is a one-of-a-kind three-day brand marketing symposium and a part of Adweek, LLC. It was also previously a weekly American marketing trade publication that was published between 1986 and April 2011.

History
In 1990, Affiliated Publications Inc., which publishes The Boston Globe, agreed to acquire 80 percent of the outstanding common stock of A/S/M Communications Inc., which published Adweek. The magazine stabilized in the 1990s.

In April 2008, Alison Fahey, Adweek'''s editor of ten years, was promoted to publisher and editorial director. She was replaced as editor by Mike Chapman, formerly of the Economist Intelligence Unit and eMarketer.

On June 2, 2020, Los Angeles-based investment firm Shamrock Capital acquired Adweek from Canadian private equity firm Beringer Capital, who itself acquired Adweek in July 2016.

Blog network
On January 15, 2015, following the acquisition of their previous parent, Mediabistro, by Prometheus Global Media, Adweek formed the "Adweek Blog Network"—which consists of several B2B blogs focusing on aspects of the mass media industry. They include AgencySpy, which focuses on advertising agencies, Fishbowl DC, a blog focusing on politics and the media, Fishbowl NY, which focuses on New York City media, Galley Cat, which focuses on publishing, LostRemote, which focuses on social television, PRNewser, which focuses on public relations, SocialTimes, and TVSpy, which focuses on local television. While it operated alongside its parent publication, the blog network was kept separate from Adweeks main blog AdFreak.

The most notable member of the blog network is TVNewser, which focuses on the American news media and broadcast industry. The site was founded as CableNewser by then-Towson University student Brian Stelter in January 2004, who maintained the site until joining The New York Times as a media reporter in July 2007. The site's Managing Editor is currently former MSNBC producer Chris Ariens.  Editor Kevin Allocca was hired in July 2009, and Alissa Krinsky serves as a contributor to the site. TVNewser is highly-read within the broadcasting industry: The New York Times'' characterized the site as being "read religiously by network presidents, media executives, producers and publicists ... because it provides a quick snapshot of the industry on any given day." Brian Williams, then anchor of NBC Nightly News, described the blog as "the closest thing to the bible of what's going on in [the news broadcasting] industry". CNN's Miles O'Brien felt that the site "makes me feel like I'm in the middle of a cocktail party of all people who know what's going on in my business." Both MSNBC's Dan Abrams and CNN's Jeff Greenfield have lauded the site for being good at separating fact from fiction.

See also
 List of AIGA medalists
D&AD
AIGA
Core77

References

External links

Weekly magazines published in the United States
Magazines established in 1978
Magazines about advertising
Professional and trade magazines
VNU Business Media publications
Magazines published in New York City